East Coulee is a community within the Town of Drumheller, Alberta, Canada. It was previously a hamlet within the former Municipal District (MD) of Badlands No. 7 prior to the MD's amalgamation with the former City of Drumheller on January 1, 1998. It is also recognized as a designated place by Statistics Canada.

The community is within Census Division No. 5 and in the federal riding of Crowfoot.

It was one of the filming locations of the television series MythQuest.



History  
During its peak years around 1930 and again later in the mid-1940s, East Coulee was home to over 3,000 residents and dozens of thriving businesses. In the mid-1950s, however, its population began to plummet and its business count dropped to three—a hotel, a garage and a grocery store. By 1970, the community's school had closed.

As with other coal communities, East Coulee's demise began in the 1950s due to the combination of expanding oil and natural gas industries and the transition of many industries to fuels other than coal. The reduced demand for the valley's coal resulted in the closure of all Drumheller area mines at the time except for the Atlas Mine at East Coulee. The Atlas Mine survived until 1979 as a severely scaled back version, decreasing from year-round to seasonal operation, and from employing more than 200 miners to having only 60 on the payroll. The mine's reduction in the 1950s sent much of the community's population to other areas in search of work, leaving an eerie mix of boarded-up buildings and abandoned mines amid the stark scenery of Alberta's badlands.</ref>

Demographics 

As a designated place in the 2011 Census, East Coulee had a population of 140 living in 77 of its 95 total dwellings, a −20.9% change from its 2006 population of 177.

See also 
List of communities in Alberta

References 

Drumheller
Former designated places in Alberta
Former hamlets in Alberta
Ghost towns in Alberta
Populated places disestablished in 1998